Queimadas is a settlement in the central part of the island of São Nicolau, Cape Verde. It is situated 3 km northwest of Ribeira Brava. It is part of the municipality of Ribeira Brava and the parish of Nossa Senhora da Lapa.

See also
List of villages and settlements in Cape Verde

References

Villages and settlements in São Nicolau, Cape Verde
Ribeira Brava, Cape Verde